Uncensored refers to censorship

Uncensored may also refer to:
 WCW Uncensored, annual professional wrestling event
 Uncensored (Daron Jones album)
 Uncensored (The Bob & Tom Show album)
 Uncensored (film), a 1942 British World War II drama
 Philadelphia International Records, a record label previously known as Uncensored Records

See also